The Barefoot Executive (also known as The Rating Game) is a 1971 American comedy film starring Kurt Russell, Joe Flynn, Wally Cox, Heather North, Harry Morgan, and John Ritter (in his film debut), about a pet chimpanzee, named Raffles, who can predict the popularity of television programs. Produced by Walt Disney Productions and directed by Robert Butler, it was one of the "gimmick comedies" (geared towards children with a touch of adult humor for older viewers) Disney was known for in the 1960s and 1970s, and was frequently shown on The Wonderful World of Disney from the late 1970s through the 1980s.

Plot 
A satire of network television, the movie follows the adventures of an ambitious mailroom clerk, Steven Post (Russell) at the fictional struggling UBC (United Broadcasting Corporation) Network.  Post discovers that a chimpanzee named Raffles, left in the care of his girlfriend Jennifer Scott (played by Heather North) by neighbors who moved to San Francisco, has the uncanny ability to choose which television programs will succeed or fail with audiences.  While watching a program, Raffles blows a raspberry at shows he hates and claps his hands at shows he likes.

Post smuggles the chimpanzee into the UBC building when various programs are being previewed for executives and watches as the chimpanzee gives his vote from the projection room.  The first program that receives Raffles's approval is a movie named Devil Dan.  Post tells the programming executives that Devil Dan will draw large audiences.  The executives disagree and choose not to program the movie.  To prove he's got a sure-fire way of choosing hits, Post sneaks into UBC's broadcast center to switch the reels.  Executives are outraged when Devil Dan airs - but Post is proved right.  The movie propels UBC to first place in the ratings war.  Post successfully masks the chimpanzee's abilities as his own and rises to vice president of UBC, now the top-rated area network. However, this also creates suspicion and resentment among UBC executives, mainly because they believe Post is too young to merit the title of vice president. Their resentment reaches a breaking point at a television award ceremony where Steven Post receives the title of "Television's Man of the Year" and the emcee mistakenly identifies Post as the president of UBC.

Fearing that Post's seemingly miraculous abilities will make their own jobs unnecessary, network president E. J. Crampton (Morgan) and former vice-president Francis X. Wilbanks (Joe Flynn) attempt to discover his secret to success. One toady (Ritter) sees a bunch of bananas in Post's apartment, which leads to a humorous scene where the executives are seen eating bananas as they believe an idea that a New Guinea tribe considered bananas to be brain food. The flunky also hears sounds coming from Post's closet and believes he is holding a hostage, which serves to intensify the surveillance of Post and his new luxury apartment.

Using a spyglass to peer through his apartment window at night, the toady discovers the chimpanzee watching television with Post. Upon spying the chimpanzee going to the refrigerator for a beer during the commercial break, the executives realize the chimpanzee's true abilities.

Fearing the revelation that America's favorite TV programs were being picked by an ape would spell the end of television, the executives decide to steal the chimpanzee and return it to the jungle.

Wilbanks and his chauffeur, Albert Mertons (Wally Cox), venture out a narrow ledge in an attempt to snatch the chimpanzee out of Post's apartment in his absence. The plan goes awry and the duo become stranded on the ledge until the police, the fire department, and a Catholic priest arrive, mistaking their break in for a potential suicide.

As a last-ditch effort, the network offers Post $1,000,000 in exchange for the chimpanzee, which he ultimately accepts. Jennifer becomes disenchanted with him when she finds out he sold her pet for money without her consent and breaks off their relationship. She also does not believe her chimpanzee should be released into the wild.

Meanwhile, executives from every studio and camera crews crowd a cargo plane soaring over the jungle, as they prepare to parachute the chimpanzee into an unexplored section of the Amazon; but before arriving at the intended disembarkation point, the stubborn chimpanzee, not wanting to be sent into the wild, pulls a lever opening an emergency hatch which sucks all the executives out of the plane, causing them to parachute into the jungle instead. The plane returns with Raffles, and Mertons, who is more sympathetic to Jennifer's feelings, notifies Steven that the chimpanzee outsmarted the executives and is now en route back to him.

Post uses this opportunity to refund the $1,000,000 for the chimpanzee. Post comments that UBC is going to need the money now in order to fund a search party for Wilbanks and the other executives. Jennifer and Steven have not only rekindled their relationship, but are now married and set off on their honeymoon with the chimpanzee in tow as their pet. The final scenes shows the Posts on an expressway which pans out in a wide scene, while a radio announcement says that Post has just married and resigned his vice presidency of UBC, but many people are wishing him well in his future endeavors.

Cast 
 Kurt Russell - Steven Post, narrator
 Joe Flynn - Francis X. Wilbanks
 Harry Morgan - E.J. Crampton
 Wally Cox - Mertons 
 Heather North - Jennifer Scott
 Alan Hewitt - Farnsworth
 Hayden Rorke - Clifford
 John Ritter - Roger
 Jack Bender - Tom
 Tom Anfinsen - Dr. Schmidt
 George N. Neise - Network Executive
 Ed Reimers - Announcer
 Morgan Farley - Advertising Executive
 Glenn Dixon - Sponsor
 Robert Shayne - Sponsor
 Tris Coffin - Sponsor
 James B. Douglas - Network Executive 
 Ed Prentiss - Harry 
 Fabian Dean - Jackhammer Man
 Iris Adrian - Woman Shopper
 Smilin' Jack Smith - Clathworthy
 Eve Brent - Mrs. Crampton
 Sandra Gould - Mrs. Wilbanks
 James Flavin - Father O'Leary
 Peter Renaday - Policeman
 Judson Pratt - Policeman
 Vince Howard - Policeman
 Hal Baylor - Policeman
 Bill Daily - Navigator
 Dave Willock - Doorman
 Anthony Teague - TV Salesman
 Edward Faulkner - Reporter

Reception
On Rotten Tomatoes the film has an approval rating of 83% based on 6 reviews.

Howard Thompson of The New York Times described the film as a "genial but strained and arch frolic" with "one real joke" that "wears thin and frantic." Variety wrote, "Walt Disney Productions has one of the funniest comedies of the season." Gene Siskel of the Chicago Tribune gave the film three stars out of four. Charles Champlin of the Los Angeles Times called it "a light, slight, well-made, well-acted, pleasantly diverting Disney comedy which falls somewhere just north of 'The Gnome-Mobile' and well south of 'The Love Bug' on the Disney scale." David McGillivray of The Monthly Film Bulletin wrote, "Although at first glance no more than a hastily expanded idea and a chance to reunite the team that made The Computer Wore Tennis Shoes, this new Disney comedy develops into an extremely beguiling satire on the audience ratings game, while retaining enough slapstick to keep children of all audiences thoroughly entertained."

Remake 
It was re-made for the Disney Channel in 1995 starring Jason London, Eddie Albert, Michael Marich, Jay Mohr, Yvonne De Carlo, Ann Magnuson, Nathan Anderson, Terri Ivens, and Chris Elliott; and directed by Susan Seidelman.

See also
 List of American films of 1971

References

External links
  
 
 

1971 films
1971 comedy films
American comedy films
Films about television
Films directed by Robert Butler
Walt Disney Pictures films
Films set in Los Angeles
1970s English-language films
1970s American films